The Sin War is the second album on a major record label by the Polish death metal band Dies Irae released in 2002.

Track listing
"Comrade of Death" – 2:40
"Incarnation of Evil" – 3:22
"Internal War" – 4:59
"Horde of Angry Deamons" – 4:16
"Infinity" – 3:05
"Genocide Generation" – 2:42
"The Truth" – 3:32
"Beyond Sensual" – 4:58
"Another Being Wasted" – 4:29
"Nine Angels" – 5:55

Credits
Marcin "Novy" Nowak - bass, vocals
Maurycy "Mauser" Stefanowicz - guitars, music
Jacek Hiro - guitars, music, lyrics
Krzysztof "Doc" Raczkowski - drums
Jacek Wiśniewski - cover art, layout
Sławomir Wiesławski, Wojciech Wiesławski - sound engineering, producer, mixing
Łukasz Szurmiński - lyrics
Mariusz Kmiołek - management

References

2002 albums
Dies Irae (band) albums
Metal Blade Records albums
Metal Mind Productions albums